This is a comparison of chess video games.

General information

Gameplay

See also
List of chess software

Notes

References

Software comparisons